QAD Inc. is a software company that provides enterprise resource planning (ERP) software and related enterprise software to manufacturing companies. The company has customers in over 100 countries around the world.

On June 28, 2021, it was announced that Thoma Bravo would acquire QAD Inc. in an all-cash transaction with an equity value of approximately 2 billion.

History 
QAD was founded in 1979 by Pamela Lopker, who serves as president. QAD initially developed proprietary software applications for manufacturing companies in Southern California.

In 1984, QAD announced MFG/PRO, which was built using Progress Software Corporation's Fourth Generation Language (4GL) and relational database. MFG/PRO was one of the first software applications built for manufacturers following the APICS principles. MFG/PRO was also one of the first applications to support closed-loop Manufacturing Resource Planning (MRP II), as well as operation in open systems. QAD software supports lean manufacturing principles and interoperates with other systems via open standards. QAD stock began trading as of its initial public offering (IPO) on August 6, 1997.

In 2003, a product called Supply Visualization (since rebranded to Supplier Portal) was first hosted in a multi-tenant configuration for QAD customers and those customers' suppliers, establishing QAD as a player in providing Software-as-a-Service (SaaS) software for manufacturers. QAD Supplier Portal continues to allow customers and their authorized suppliers to share information about inventory, scheduling, purchase orders, shipments, Kanbans and more. In 2006, QAD announced a user interface called .NET UI, and in 2007 its core product suite name was changed from MFG/PRO to QAD Enterprise Applications. QAD began their cloud apps in 2003, and in 2011 officially launched QAD On Demand, which was later named QAD Cloud ERP.

In 2015, the QAD Cloud ERP software was enhanced further when the Channel Islands User Experience (UX) initiative was launched in phases, named after the Channel Islands off the coast of Santa Barbara, California. In 2017, the QAD Enterprise Platform was released as a way to deliver functionality to users utilizing the Channel Islands UX in QAD Cloud ERP. In 2019, QAD renamed its software portfolio to QAD Adaptive Applications. In addition, QAD's flagship ERP software was renamed QAD Adaptive ERP, which features the Adaptive UX and is built on the QAD Enterprise Platform.

QAD sells its products and services to companies in six main manufacturing industries: automotive, consumer products, high technology, food and beverage, industrial equipment and life sciences. The company's software portfolio is called QAD Adaptive Applications, which is headlined by QAD Adaptive ERP. QAD Adaptive Applications is designed to streamline the management of manufacturing operations, supply chains, financials, customers, technology and business performance. QAD Adaptive ERP is marketed as SaaS software using cloud computing.

Acquisitions 
 Sep 20, 2006 - QAD acquired Precision Software, a company delivering transportation, global trade and supply chain management software. (2019 - Precision Software renamed to QAD Precision)
 Nov 6, 2006 - QAD acquired FBO Systems, Inc., a Georgia-based company and leading provider of enterprise asset management (EAM) products and professional services.
 Jun 30, 2006 - QAD acquired Bisgen Ltd., a UK-based company whose product is tailored to the unique sales force and marketing automation needs of manufacturers.
 Apr 22, 2008 - QAD acquired FullTilt Solutions’ product suite, including Perfect Product Suite, called master data management (MDM) for Internet-enabled commerce.
 Jun 7, 2012 - QAD acquired DynaSys, a European provider of collaborative demand and supply chain planning software. (2019 - DynaSys renamed QAD DynaSys)
 Dec 31, 2012- QAD acquired CEBOS, a provider of quality management and management system standard software and services. (2019 - CEBOS renamed QAD CEBOS; 2020 - "QAD CEBOS" division name dropped and all solutions absorbed)
 Aug 22, 2018 - QAD acquired PT Iris Sistem Inforindo (PT Iris), a distributor and system integrator for QAD software operating across South Asia, primarily in Indonesia.
 Jan 5, 2021 - QAD acquired Allocation Network GmbH, a provider for strategic sourcing and supplier management, based in Munich, Germany.
 Apr 6, 2021 - QAD acquired Foreign Trade Zone Corporation, a provider of cloud-based Foreign-Trade Zone (FTZ) software and consulting services based in Mobile, Alabama. (FTZ Corp renamed to QAD Precision Foreign-Trade Zone
 Dec 14, 2021 - QAD acquired WebJaguar, founded in 2000 by Bachir Kassir, an ex-Apple engineer, and headquartered in Aliso Viejo, California, the company powers over 1,000 eCommerce stores. (WebJaguar renamed to QAD WebJaguar]
 Feb 1, 2023 - QAD announced it had acquired the Miami-based workforce provider, Redzone.

Acquisition by Thoma Bravo 
On June 28, 2021, QAD announced that it has entered into a definitive agreement to be acquired by Thoma Bravo, a private equity investment firm focused on the software and technology-enabled services sector, in an all-cash transaction with an equity value of approximately 2 billion. Under the terms of the agreement, QAD shareholders will receive $87.50 per share of Class A Common Stock or Class B Common Stock in cash.

Upon completion of the transaction, QAD will become a private company to continue investing in the development and deployment of Enterprise Resource Planning (ERP) software and related enterprise software for manufacturing companies around the world. Anton Chilton will continue to lead QAD as CEO, and the company will maintain its headquarters in Santa Barbara, California.

The QAD Board of Directors formed a special committee composed entirely of independent directors to conduct a robust process and negotiate the transaction with the assistance of independent financial and legal advisors. Following the special committee's unanimous recommendation, members of the QAD Board other than Mrs. Lopker, who recused herself, unanimously approved the merger agreement with Thoma Bravo, and recommend that QAD shareholders adopt and approve the merger agreement and the transaction.  Other QAD shareholders filed a lawsuit concerning the merger, seeking millions of dollars in damages from Mrs. Lopker and other defendants, which is scheduled for trial in the Delaware Court of Chancery in October 2023.

The acquisition of QAD by Thoma Bravo was completed in early November 2021. Following the completion of the transaction, Mrs. Lopker intends to retain a significant ownership interest in the company and will continue serving the QAD Board.

See also 
 Progress Software

References

Software companies based in California
Software companies established in 1979
Companies based in Santa Barbara, California
ERP software companies
American companies established in 1979
1979 establishments in California
1997 initial public offerings
Companies formerly listed on the Nasdaq
Software companies of the United States
2021 mergers and acquisitions
Private equity portfolio companies
Privately held companies based in California